Waverley in Mpumalanga is a small border crossing between South Africa and Eswatini. The Eswatini side of the border post is known as Lundzi. The border is open between 08:00 and 16:00.

References

Eswatini–South Africa border crossings